Mohsen Forouzan (born 3 May 1988) is an Iranian footballer who currently plays for Gol Gohar Sirjan, as a goalkeeper. He is also capped by the Iran national football team.

Club career
Forouzan started his senior career in 2004 with local club Pegah Gilan, he moved to rival club Malavan in 2007. In 2011 Forouzan signed with Tractor and played in the Asian Champions League for the first time in his career. After two years at the club Forouzan signed with another Tabrizi team, this time Gostaresh Foolad, in his only season with the club he helped the team avoid relegation. In the summer of 2014 Forouzan transferred to Esteghlal. After Mehdi Rahmati joined Esteghlal in the summer of 2015, Forouzan decided to leave the club and sign for newly promoted Siah Jamegan. He was released halfway through the 2015–2016 season.

Club career statistics

International career
He was called into Iran's 2015 AFC Asian Cup squad on 30 December 2014 by Carlos Queiroz.

Honours
Foolad
Hazfi Cup: 2020–21

References

External links
 
 

People from Rasht
1988 births
Living people
Iranian footballers
Persian Gulf Pro League players
Azadegan League players
Malavan players
Damash Gilan players
Pegah Gilan players
Gostaresh Foulad F.C. players
Tractor S.C. players
Esteghlal F.C. players
Siah Jamegan players
Pars Jonoubi Jam players
Iran under-20 international footballers
Iran international footballers
2015 AFC Asian Cup players
Association football goalkeepers
Sportspeople from Gilan province